Arnoud Nijhuis (born 9 July 1989) is a Dutch Paralympic cyclist. He represented the Netherlands at the 2016 Summer Paralympics held in Rio de Janeiro, Brazil and he won two medals: the silver medal in the men's 1 km time trial C1–3 event and the bronze medal in the men's individual pursuit C1 event.

At the 2016 UCI Para-cycling Track World Championships held in Montichiari, Italy, he won the gold medal in the 1 km time trial C1 event and the bronze medal in the 3 km pursuit C1 event.

At the 2018 UCI Para-cycling Track World Championships held in Rio de Janeiro, Brazil, he won the silver medal in the men's time trial C1 event.

References 

Living people
1989 births
Place of birth missing (living people)
Cyclists at the 2016 Summer Paralympics
Medalists at the 2016 Summer Paralympics
Paralympic silver medalists for the Netherlands
Paralympic bronze medalists for the Netherlands
Paralympic medalists in cycling
Paralympic cyclists of the Netherlands
21st-century Dutch people